Gabon–Turkey relations are the foreign relations between Gabon and Turkey. Turkey has an embassy in Libreville since 2012. Gabon opened an embassy in Ankara in 2015.

Diplomatic relations 

Historically, Turkey has had strong relations with Ghana. Turkey was very supportive of the Gabonese economic expansion after Bongo's accession to the presidency and cooperated with technical expertise during the construction of the Transgabonais Railway to the upper Ogooué River valley.

Relations became tense when after the French investigative reporter Pierre Péan unmasked that the Bongo government used Turkish aid to build a lavish new presidential palace for $900 million (worth US$4.12 billion in 2020) that enriched the French expatriates in Gabon.

Presidential visits

Trade relations 
 Trade volume between the two countries was US$38.9 million in 2018.

Educational relations 
Turkish Maarif Foundation runs schools in Gabon and Turkey has been providing scholarships to students from Gabon since 1992.

See also 

 Foreign relations of Gabon
 Foreign relations of Turkey

References 

Gabon–Turkey relations
Turkey
Bilateral relations of Turkey